Larissa Ivanovna Diadkova (born 1954 in Zelenodolsk) is a Russian mezzo-soprano.

Career
For her musical education, she studied at Kazan Conservatory before moving on to the Saint Petersburg Conservatory. In 1978, she became a member of the Kirov Opera where she initially sang small roles. As a member of the Kirov Opera, Diadkova toured internationally under company director Valery Gergiev. She made her Metropolitan Opera debut in 1996 as Madelon in Andrea Chénier and performed the role of Marfa in The Tsar's Bride at La Scala in 1998. She also appeared in four Metropolitan productions in 1998: Prince Igor, Ruslan and Lyudmila, Mazeppa and Betrothal in a Monastery. Her other notable roles include Ježibaba in a 2002 modernization of Rusalka and Azucena opposite Roberto Alagna.

Personal life
Diadkova lives in Luxembourg with her husband, a former singer with the Mariinsky Theatre, and their daughter.

Selected discography
 Dvorak: Rusalka / Conlon (DVD)
 Glinka: Ruslan And Lyudmila / Gergiev, Kirov Opera 
 Prokofiev: Betrothal In A Monastery / Gergiev
 Prokofiev: Love For Three Oranges / Gergiev
 Rimsky-Korsakov: Kashchey the Immortal / Gergiev
 Nicolai Rimsky-Korsakov: Sadko, 14 February 1995, conducted by Valery Gergiev, live performance
 Rimsky-korsakov: The Legend Of The Invisible City Of Kitezh / Gergiev
 Shostakovich: Orchestral Songs Vol 1 / Järvi
 Tchaikovsky, Mazeppa, 14 April 1998, conducted by Valery Gergiev, live performance
 Tchaikovsky: Mazeppa / Järvi
 Tchaikovsky: Pique Dame / Jansons
 Verdi: Falstaff / Abbado
 Verdi: Il Trovatore / Pappano

References

1954 births
Living people
Russian mezzo-sopranos
Operatic mezzo-sopranos
20th-century Russian women opera singers
21st-century Russian women opera singers
Kazan Conservatory alumni